Álvaro Bautista Arce (born 21 November 1984) is a Spanish motorcycle road racer. He won the 2022  Superbike World Championship, with Ducati factory team.

After the 2019 World Superbike season with the factory Ducati team, for 2020 and 2021 he was contracted to ride the Honda Fireblade in World Superbikes, with the team being run under full HRC control.

He competed in the MotoGP class from 2010 to 2018.

Bautista then rode a Ducati with the Aspar (then Ángel Nieto) MotoGP team in 2017 and 2018, before moving to the Superbike World Championship for 2019.

Career

Early career
Born in Talavera de la Reina, Castile-La Mancha, Bautista rode a motorcycle for the first time at three years of age. His father owned a motorcycle repair shop and built his first bike from scratch; Bautista competed in his first race five years later. In only his second season he finished runner-up in the Madrid Minimoto Championship and then went on to win the championship three years in a row. In 1997 he simultaneously raced in the 50cc Aprilia Cup where he claimed his first podium, finishing the season in 6th place.

Another year in the 50cc Aprilia Cup saw him taking two more podiums and ending the season in third place when Alberto Puig chose him from over 4000 applicants for the now famous Movistar Activa Joven Cup in 1999. He finished his first year in 5th place, ahead of Dani Pedrosa, earning him a second year in the Cup and a place as a back-up rider for the 125cc Spanish Championship.

However, injury the following year set him back and despite taking one podium in the Movistar Cup, he only finished the season in ninth place. In 2001 he entered the 125cc Spanish Championship with Team Belart which folded halfway through the season due to financial reasons. But he was spotted by Manuel Morente who signed him up for the remaining races of the season and offered him a new team with iconic Atlético Madrid sponsoring for the following year.

In 2002, finally having official material at his disposal, Bautista fought with Hector Barbera for the 125cc Spanish Championship until the last race of the season at Valencia. He set pole-position, but only finished fifth after a crash, securing him the runner-up spot overall. The same year Bautista made his international debut in the 2002 Grand Prix motorcycle racing season with the same team, running as a wildcard entry at Jerez, Catalunya and Valencia. He also competed in the 125cc European Championship where he scored a podium in Assen and a fourth place in Hungary.

125cc World Championship

2003
Bautista's connection with football was deepened in 2003 when former footballer Clarence Seedorf signed him up for the newly found Seedorf Racing Team, to compete his first full season in the 125cc World Championship. He finished his debut year in 20th place overall with 31 points, his best finishes being a fourth place at Phillip Island and a sixth place at Valencia. The same year he was also crowned the 125cc Spanish Champion with two races to go and after an extremely dominant season, never being off the podium and scoring five consecutive pole-to-victory finishes.

2004
The Spaniard continued with Seedorf Racing in the 125cc World Championship for the 2004 season. He ended the year in seventh place overall after taking his first podium and fastest lap at Donington Park. He finished on the podium a total of four times, with a second place at Donington Park and thirds at Qatar, Malaysia and Valencia.

2005
With the main contenders leaving the class, Bautista started the 2005 season as one of the 125cc title favourites. However, a manufacturer switch from Aprilia to Honda, a different team structure, crashes and mechanical failures saw him struggle throughout a disappointing season which he finished in 15th place.

2006
After difficulties to get out of his contract with Seedorf Racing, Bautista joined the ranks of Jorge Martinez’ MVA Aspar Team only shortly before the start of the 2006 season. Already having a complete 125cc team with four riders before the signing of Bautista, Martinez still managed to provide another bike, mechanics and sponsors for the Talaverano who he had already tried to sign up two years earlier.

The effort paid off handsomely as Bautista went on to take his first 125cc victory at the inaugural 2006 Grand Prix in Jerez, leading the race from start to finish. Another dominant win followed in Qatar, making him the first 125cc rider in four years to win back-to-back races. His excellent form continued until the end of the year, leading the championship table with a great margin from start to finish and eventually becoming 125cc World Champion in Australia, three races before the end of the season. Along the way he took eight wins and broke numerous records, including the highest number of points in the class and most podium finishes in a single season. He stood on the rostrum in 14 out of 16 races. The only times he didn't finish on the podium, he finished in 4th place. Both in Le Mans and Valencia he was leading the race before mechanical problems saw him drop down the field.

250cc World Championship

2007
For the 2007 Grand Prix motorcycle racing season, Bautista continued with the Aspar Team, moving up to the 250cc class. He took his first 250cc victory at the 2007 Italian Grand Prix at Mugello on 3 June, also claiming his maiden 250cc pole position that weekend. A second 250cc victory came in Estoril on 16 September in the Portuguese Grand Prix, where – having started from sixth on the grid - he dropped to 12th during the first lap to carve his way through the field and eventually take an easy win. He finally ended the 2007 season fourth overall in the Championship and was subsequently awarded the MotoGP / FIM "Rookie of the Year" Award for the 250cc class.

2008

Having been tipped as the 2008 250cc champion, he finished 6th in the season opener in Qatar. At Jerez he looked set to win before his engine gave out on the final lap causing Marco Simoncelli to hit his bike and both riders to crash out, subsequently handing Mika Kallio the win. Bautista finally took his first win of the season at Estoril before he crashed out of the lead in China and Italy, while only finishing 14th in Le Mans.In Bautista's home race at the Catalunya circuit he dominated the qualifying sessions, took pole position and led the race from the start, but an error while switching gears in the last lap gave Marco Simoncelli the chance to pass him and left him unable to fight back before the finish line. The British round at Donington marked his fourth pole of the season. In another fight with Simoncelli, Bautista missed the top spot again after an overly optimistic passing manoeuver by Simoncelli in the penultimate lap, which caused both riders to go wide and allowed Mika Kallio to pass them and snatch the win again. A second win came at Assen, despite a bad start from pole position leaving him 8th at the end of lap 1. He added two more wins at San Marino and Malaysia and his string of ten podium finishes after the abysmal start to the year eventually saw him end the season in second place behind Simoncelli.

2009
Bautista started 2009 with a strong showing of speed by taking three of the first five pole positions, but without converting any of them into a victory. Wins in Japan and Catalunya along a more steady start than the previous year moved him to the top of the championship, but an ultimately very costly collision with Hiroshi Aoyama in the final laps of the Assen Grand Prix handed the lead to the Japanese rider. A run of five successive podium finishes kept Bautista in the running for the championship, but a crash out of fourth place at Estoril due to a gearbox issue and errors at Phillip Island and Sepang finally dashed his title hopes with Hiroshi Aoyama going on to win the final 250cc championship for Honda.

MotoGP World Championship

2010
Bautista moved up to MotoGP for the  season, with the factory Suzuki team. After missing the French Grand Prix due to injury, Bautista made a steady return to the class and finished fifth at the Catalan Grand Prix.

2011
During practice for the  MotoGP season opener in Qatar, Bautista suffered a broken left femur as a result of a crash at turn 15. Bautista proved on numerous occasions the potential of the Suzuki GSV-R, and almost claimed podium finishes at several races. His biggest flaw was arguably his tendency to crash, often while fighting for podium positions. He eventually finished the season 13th in the championship standings.

2012
On 9 November 2011, it was announced that Bautista would move to Gresini Racing for the  season. He replaced the late Marco Simoncelli and the World Superbike bound Hiroshi Aoyama. He would later be joined by Gresini's Moto2 rider Michele Pirro, who would ride a CRT specification FTR-Honda as opposed to Bautista, who would ride a MotoGP specification Honda. Bautista finished each of the first five races inside the top ten; of those races, his best result was sixth place on three occasions. Bautista achieved his first pole position in MotoGP at the British Grand Prix; he finished a tenth of a second clear of Ben Spies and Casey Stoner, who both joined Bautista on the front row. Bautista could not maintain the lead at the start of the race, after Spies led into the first corner; he recovered to finish in fourth place – behind Jorge Lorenzo, Stoner and Dani Pedrosa – which was his then best result in the MotoGP class.

At Assen, Bautista qualified eighth, but made a slow start and tried to alleviate his losses by braking late for the first turn. He locked the front wheel, and fell from his bike, taking down championship leader Lorenzo in the process. Both bikes slid along the ground, with Lorenzo's throttle jammed open, which blew the engine. Lorenzo lost his 25-point lead in the championship, after Stoner won the race; Yamaha lodged a complaint with race direction, stating that Bautista's actions were dangerous, and he was thus given a grid penalty for the German Grand Prix – starting last on the grid – for his actions.

Bautista finished the next five races within the top ten each time, before achieving his first ever MotoGP podium at Misano. He obtained another podium finish two races later at Motegi, after a race long battle with Briton Cal Crutchlow ended with Crutchlow running out of fuel before the race finish.

2013
In 2013 Bautista continued riding for Team Gresini, with a new sponsor GO & FUN and teammate Bryan Staring. Bautista had a good season, battling consistently amongst the second group of riders, along with Valentino Rossi, Cal Crutchlow and Stefan Bradl. He finished sixth overall in the championship behind Crutchlow and in front of Bradl, with a best result of fourth obtained on three occasions, at Laguna Seca, Aragon and Motegi.

2014
For the 2014 season, Bautista was joined by new teammate Scott Redding, but had a difficult start to the 2014 season, crashing out of each of the first three events on the calendar. He obtained his first championship points of the season with a sixth place in the Spanish Grand Prix, at Jerez. This was followed by a third-place finish in the French Grand Prix, his first podium since the 2012 Japanese Grand Prix.

2015
For the 2015 season, Bautista remained with the Gresini team – now riding an Aprilia – where he was joined by new teammate Marco Melandri. At the midway point of the season, Bautista had collected 13 points, and finished 16th in the riders' championship with 31 points.

2018

In August, Bautista confirmed he would be departing MotoGP following nine seasons, changing to World Superbike with the factory Ducati team in 2019.

Following Jorge Lorenzo pulling out of his third race at Phillip Island in Australia due to injury, Bautista replaced him for Ducati for the Australian Grand Prix weekend before returning to the Ángel Nieto Team for the final 2 Grands Prix of the season.

Superbike World Championship

2019

After nine seasons appearing in the premier class, Bautista has confirmed that he will not race MotoGP in 2019 because he does not get a team. He has a contract with the factory Ducati World Superbike. In this season he managed to become runner up.

2020

In the 2020 season, Bautista moves to the factory Honda team. Bautista, who made his debut at WSBK 2019 with the Aruba.it Racing - Ducati team, won 11 consecutive races at the start of the season. Honda Racing Corporation has announced that it has signed a deal with the Spanish rider. A former 125cc World Champion and 15-time WorldSBK race winner so far in his debut season, Bautista is a highly skilled and fast rider who will contribute greatly to the development of the HRC project in the Superbike World Championship. This season he can only occupy the 9th position in the final standings with a collection of one podium.

2021

Since moving from Aruba.it - Ducati to Team HRC, Bautista has not been so smooth in the form he has shown. The significant character difference between the Ducati Panigale V4 R and the Honda CBR1000RR-R made Alvaro Bautista need a lot of adjustments. Until finally at the end of the 2021 season he decided to move to the Ducati Team.

2022

Bautista decided to return to Aruba.it-Ducati for the 2022-2023 season. Previously he had left the factory Ducati team by leaving a contract that was supposed to expire in 2020. But in 2020, he chose to Team HRC Honda. After 2 seasons of difficulties, Bautista finally managed to become the 2022 World Superbike world champion in the Mandalika round after finishing 2nd in Race 2.
In season 2023, he decided to stay at this team.

Career statistics

Grand Prix motorcycle racing

By season

By class

Races by year
(key) (Races in bold indicate pole position, races in italics indicate fastest lap)

Superbike World Championship

By season

Races by year
(key) (Races in bold indicate pole position) (Races in italics indicate fastest lap)

* Season still in progress.

References

External links

 
 

1984 births
Living people
Sportspeople from the Province of Toledo
Spanish motorcycle racers
125cc World Championship riders
250cc World Championship riders
Suzuki MotoGP riders
Gresini Racing MotoGP riders
Aspar Racing Team MotoGP riders
Ángel Nieto Team MotoGP riders
Ducati Corse MotoGP riders
Superbike World Championship riders
MotoGP World Championship riders
125cc World Riders' Champions